Brande Nicole Roderick (born June 13, 1974) is an American model and actress known for her appearances in Baywatch and Playboy. In April 2000, she was selected as Playmate of the Month and then became the Playmate of the Year in 2001.

Career
In 2000, Roderick starred as Leigh Dyer in Baywatch. In April 2000, she appeared in Playboy magazine as Playmate of the Month. In 2001, Roderick became the Playmate of the Year. In 2003, she starred in the Bollywood movie Out of Control, as the American wife of an Indian man (played by Riteish Deshmukh) who, on a visit to India, gets pressured by his family into marrying an Indian girl.

Other recent film credits include Starsky & Hutch, Snoop Dogg's Hood of Horror, Club Wild Side 2 and The Nanny Diaries. In addition, she has guest-starred in Joey, The Parkers, Just Shoot Me!, Fear Factor and Beverly Hills, 90210.

Appearances
Roderick is a "Girl of RPS" for the USA Rock Paper Scissors League. In 2006, Roderick was one of six celebrity contestants on the CBS summer series, Gameshow Marathon. She was the runner-up to Kathy Najimy. In 2009, she appeared in the second season of Celebrity Apprentice. Throughout the season, each celebrity raised money for a charity of his or her choice; Roderick selected the California Police Youth Charities. On the second to last episode of Celebrity Apprentice 2, she was eliminated along with fellow contestant Jesse James from the final four.

In April 2009, Roderick served as host of the Playboy Shootout reality competition on Playboy TV.

In February 2012, Roderick hosted the Aces & Angels Super Bowl XLVI Party in Indianapolis, Indiana alongside Leeann Tweeden and Elaine Alden. In 2013 she returned in Celebrity Apprentice 6 All-Star, with Claudia Jordan and Dennis Rodman of season 2.

Ventures
As of 2008, Roderick had a networking company named Financially Hung. She described the company as being "like MySpace for adults."

Roderick runs the online fantasy gaming website FantaZ. She also has a business partnership with Adam Levine of Maroon 5 in the Italian designer shoe label Pantofola d'Oro.

Personal life
Roderick was born in Novato, California, and attended Santa Rosa Junior College. She dated the late Playboy founder Hugh Hefner from 2000 to 2001 and was also romantically linked to former NFL player Cade McNown. In August 2006, she became engaged to Glenn Cadrez, a former NFL player who played 11 seasons for the Denver Broncos, the New York Jets and the Kansas City Chiefs. They married in June 2007 and have two sons. They divorced in 2017.

See also
 List of people in Playboy 2000–09

References

External links

 
 
 
 Brande "Rock" Roderick - An Official "Girl of Rock Paper Scissors"

1974 births
Living people
People from Novato, California
American film actresses
American television actresses
Participants in American reality television series
2000s Playboy Playmates
Playboy Playmates of the Year
Santa Rosa Junior College alumni
The Apprentice (franchise) contestants
American expatriate actresses in India
Actresses in Hindi cinema
21st-century American women
21st-century American actresses